Tarasivka is a village in Kropyvnytskyi Raion, Kirovohrad Oblast, Ukraine. It belongs to Oleksandrivka settlement hromada, one of the hromadas of Ukraine. The village has a population of 24.

Until 18 July 2020, Tarasivka belonged to Oleksandrivka Raion. The raion was abolished in July 2020 as part of the administrative reform of Ukraine, which reduced the number of raions of Kirovohrad Oblast to four. The area of Oleksandrivka Raion was merged into Kropyvnytskyi Raion.

References

Villages in Kropyvnytskyi Raion